Ashley Hall may refer to:

Ashley Hall, Cheshire, a country house in England
Ashley Hall (Charleston, South Carolina), a school in the U.S.
Ashley Hall, Lancashire, a country house in England
Ashley Hall (musician) (born 1959), an American musician
Ashley Hall (golfer) (born 1983), Australian professional golfer

See also

Ashleigh Hall (died 2009), murder victim of Peter Chapman